Haylie Katherine Duff (born February 19, 1985) is an American actress, singer and songwriter, and the older sister of American singer and actress Hilary Duff. She is best known for her roles as Sandy Jameson in the television series 7th Heaven, Amy Sanders in Lizzie McGuire, Summer Wheatley in Napoleon Dynamite, and Annie Nelson in the made-for-television films Love Takes Wing along with its sequel Love Finds a Home.

Early life
The older sister of Hilary Duff, Haylie Duff was born in Houston, Texas. Duff's mother, Susan Colleen Duff (née Cobb) is a film producer who was a co-executive producer of A Cinderella Story (2004), a producer of The Perfect Man (2005) and Material Girls (2006), and the manager of Hilary; she was previously a homemaker. Her father, Robert Erhard "Bob" Duff, a partner and owner in a chain of convenience stores with his father, John B. Duff, resides at the family home in Houston to maintain the family's business. She began her acting career as an offshoot of her early dance training. Growing up in Texas, Duff began ballet at an early age. By the age of eight, Duff landed a role in the Houston Metropolitan Dance Company's production of The Nutcracker Suite.

Career

Acting

Duff's early career started by making guest appearances on made-for-television films such as True Women and on TV series such as The Amanda Show. In addition to guest-starring roles on Chicago Hope, Boston Public, and Third Watch, Duff became a familiar face starting in late 2002 as Amy Sanders on Lizzie McGuire. In 2004, Duff made a guest appearance on That's So Raven as Katina Jones. After making guest appearances on television, Duff received her first role in a feature film when she was cast as Summer Wheatley in Napoleon Dynamite. The film earned her first Teen Choice Award win. She continued making guest appearances, which include Joan of Arcadia and American Dreams. She also lent her voice talent to the Christmas animation film In Search of Santa which again, featured sister Hilary. In 2005, Duff joined the cast of the television series 7th Heaven, playing Sandy Jameson, best friend to Simon's girlfriend Rose.

In June 2006, Duff joined the Broadway cast of Hairspray, portraying mean girl Amber Von Tussle, and left the role in early October 2006.

Duff has also starred in Material Girls with sister Hilary, where she is credited as co-producer, with her mother and sister credited as producers. Following Material Girls, Duff appeared in various made-for-television or straight-to-DVD films including Nightmare, My Sexiest Year, Legacy, Backwoods, Love Takes Wing, Love Finds a Home and My Nanny's Secret.

Between 2008 and 2015, Duff appeared in various films and TV roles, including; Fear Island, Tug and Slightly Single in L.A.. She lent her voice to the animated film Foodfight!, but due to distribution issues, the film was delayed for years until it finally saw a release in 2012. Duff hosted the reality show Legally Blonde: The Musical – The Search for Elle Woods, which searched for an actress to take over the lead role in Legally Blonde: The Musical where she had been in the chorus. She was also listed as an executive producer of the series. Duff's project was the film Badge of Honor in 2015.

Music

Duff has recorded numerous singles for various soundtracks with her sister, with most of them appearing on the Disneymania discs. Notable soundtracks include: In Search of Santa, The Lizzie McGuire Movie, A Cinderella Story, and Material Girls. She was featured on rapper Kool G Rap's album Half a Klip, providing the background vocals on the track "On the Rise Again" produced by DJ Premier. Duff also sang "A Whatever Life" for the Stuck in the Suburbs soundtrack and "Sweetest Pain" for the Raising Helen soundtrack. She is also featured on song "Babysitting Is a Bum Deal" on the album Family Guy: Live in Las Vegas, singing a duet with Seth MacFarlane as his character Stewie. In addition to singing, Duff has also written and co-written several songs for her sister Hilary's first two studio albums, Metamorphosis and her self titled second album. She also contributed the whistling to Hilary’s song "Sparks" from her album Breathe In. Breathe Out.

After signing with Hollywood Records, Duff planned on releasing "Screwed" in August 2004 as her debut solo single. When Paris Hilton revealed she had also recorded a version for her debut album, Duff claimed that she had procured the rights from the songwriters prior and attempted to block her from releasing the song. Hilton's version was leaked onto radio airplay before their management teams could settle the dispute, and Duff's team decided not to pursue the case further. In 2008, Duff's debut album, Walk the Walk, was scheduled to be released later in the year. The album included "Holiday" as its lead single, "Walk the Walk" as its title track, "Faded", "Crush", and "Just a Minute"; however, it was never released and Duff parted with Hollywood Records. The song "Holiday" was later re-recorded by Hilary Duff and released on her greatest hits album Best of Hilary Duff.

Other ventures
In 2012 she started her own blog called Real Girl's Kitchen, which was later picked up by the Cooking Channel and made into a show in 2014. In 2013, Duff released her first book called "The Real Girl's Kitchen". In 2017 Haylie started her own children's fashion line called Little Moon Society.

Personal life

Religious beliefs

In 2009, Duff stated, "I am a Christian, but I also don't really see myself as a religious person. I see myself as more of a spiritual person. There are a lot of things that I do agree with in Christianity and things that I don't agree with. I'm not a regular churchgoer, but I do think that I have my own beliefs that I feel strongly about."

Relationships
In April 2014, Duff announced her engagement to Matt Rosenberg after a year and a half of dating. She and Rosenberg have two daughters.

Filmography

Film

Television

Stage

Discography

Singles

As lead artist

As featured artist

Other appearances

Music videos

Songwriting credits

Bibliography

Awards and nominations

References

External links

 
 Little Moon Society
 

1985 births
20th-century American actresses
21st-century American actresses
21st-century American singers
Actresses from Houston
American child actresses
American child singers
American women pop singers
American film actresses
American musical theatre actresses
American television actresses
American television personalities
American women television personalities
American voice actresses
Hilary Duff
Living people
Musicians from Houston
Songwriters from Texas
American fashion designers
American women fashion designers
21st-century American women singers
Children's clothing designers